Salirhabdus euzebyi is a Gram-positive, spore-forming, aerobic, halotolerant and motile bacterium from the genus of Salipaludibacillus which has been isolated from sea salt from the island of Sal in Portugal.

References

 

Bacillaceae
Bacteria described in 2007